Neuwiedia griffithii is a species of orchid that occurs from Vietnam, peninsular Malaysia to northern Sumatra.

References 

griffithii
Orchids of Malaya
Orchids of Sumatra
Orchids of Vietnam
Plants described in 1874